The Emlenton Low Level Bridge is a girder bridge that spans the Allegheny River at Emlenton in the U.S state of Pennsylvania. It connects two separate portions of the borough in Venango and Clarion counties. It replaced, an 1883 truss bridge that stood just upstream, which replaced several previous wooden structures; the modern bridge was constructed in 1987. This bridge is dwarfed by its more famous nearby cousin, the 1968 Emlenton Bridge along Interstate 80.

See also
List of bridges documented by the Historic American Engineering Record in Pennsylvania
List of crossings of the Allegheny River

References
Nat'l Bridges article

External links
 (documentation of 1883 truss bridge)

Bridges over the Allegheny River
Bridges completed in 1987
Bridges in Venango County, Pennsylvania
Bridges in Clarion County, Pennsylvania
Historic American Engineering Record in Pennsylvania
Road bridges in Pennsylvania
1987 establishments in Pennsylvania
Girder bridges in the United States